Little Flower Convent Higher Secondary School in Irinjalakuda, in the Kerala state of India, was established by the sisters of the Congregation of Mother of Carmel (C.M.C). in 1923. It is the oldest and largest educational institution in Irinjalakuda. It is the largest congregation of sisters founded by Blessed Chavara Kuriyakose Elias. It is a government aided English and Malayalam-medium school. The school started with lower primary and high school. Later in 2003, higher secondary section was also added to it. It began as a Malayalam-medium school and an English-medium was added later on. The school is primarily for girls and boys are allowed until fourth grade. The school is going to open a new branch in Bathinda, Punjab. The construction work has been started and soon it will be benefited for the students of bathinda.

Notable alumni
Innocent, MP and Malayalam cinema actor

Principals
 Sr. Florence CMC (a.k.a. Sr. Lilly Paul. P) 2010–present
 Sr. Ann Maria (a.k.a. Sr. Kochumariam K.A) 2006 - 2010
 Sr. Deepthi (a.k.a. Sr. Anna.K.K) 2004 - 2006
 Sr. Merceena (a.k.a. Sr. Achama A.L) 2001 - 2004
 Sr. Josrita (a.k.a. Sr. Reethamma T.K.) 1995 - 2001
 Sr. Mercy 1984 - 1995
 Sr. Mary Justin 1978 - 1984
 Sr. Clarissa 1971 - 1978
 Sr. Abraham 1969 - 1971
 Sr. Domittila 1965 - 1969
 Sr. Celin 1935 - 1965

References

Catholic secondary schools in India
Christian schools in Kerala
Primary schools in Kerala
High schools and secondary schools in Kerala
Schools in Thrissur district
Educational institutions established in 1923
1923 establishments in India